Romulea rosea is a herbaceous perennial plant in the family Iridaceae. It is a small plant, usually less than 20 cm high, with grass-like leaves. The flowers, which appear in spring, are pink with a yellow throat. Common names include Guildford grass, onion grass and rosy sandcrocus.

R. rosea is endemic to the western Cape Province (now Western Cape, Eastern Cape and Northern Cape) in South Africa, but it has become naturalised in Europe, Australia, New Zealand, and California in the United States. It is considered to be an environmental weed in much of Australia.

References

rosea
Endemic flora of South Africa
Flora of the Cape Provinces
Flora naturalised in Australia
Plants described in 1767